The 1945–46 Macedonian Republic League was the second since its establishment. Pobeda Skopje (a one of two forerunners of FK Vardar) won their first championship title.

Participating teams

Final table

External links
SportSport.ba
Football Federation of Macedonia 

Macedonian Football League seasons
Yugo
3